Urs Freuler (born 6 November 1958 in Bilten, Canton of Glarus) is a Swiss cyclist, who raced professionally between 1980 and 1997, during which he won 124 victories. He was named Swiss Sports Personality of the Year in 1982 and 1983.

He was born in Bilten. As an amateur, he was the champion of his country in several categories and also achieved fame in international competitions.

He was a racer of great speed, who participated both in road races as well as track cycling. In the latter, he was the world champion in the keirin twice and the points race eight times and victor in 21 six-day races. On the road, he was victorious in numerous stages  and criteriums. He competed in the team pursuit event at the 1980 Summer Olympics.

In 1981, Freuler was riding for a personal sponsor, when the TI–Raleighcycling team had problems to form a team for the 1981 Tour de France. The rules allowed for the Raleigh team to hire cyclists who were not riding for a cycling team, and Freuler was added to the Tour squad. Because Freuler, as a still young professional and with contracts for a full winter season of Six Days coming up, his team leader Peter Post and Freuler agreed that Freuler, although capable of taking on mountain stages, had to leave the race before the Alps would be visited. Freuler, who acted as a replacement for sprinter Jan Raas, was able to win with TI–Raleighthe two team time trials and stage 7, and left the race in stage 15. After that he never started in the Tour again,.

Freuler, for the chief part of his career riding for Italian teams, did win in another of the three Grand Tours, the Giro d'Italia, from 1982 to 1989. In 1982 he won three stages, in 1984 he won four stages and in 1985 he once again claimed three stage victories. In total he won 15 stages in the Giro and also claimed the points classification in 1984.

Major results

Track
 World champion of points race in 1981, 1982, 1983, 1984, 1985, 1986, 1987, and 1989
 World champion of Keirin in 1983 and 1985
 European champion of sprint in 1981
 21 six-day races from 1981 to 1994, with Patrick Sercu, Robert Dill-Bundi,  Hans Känel, René Pijnen, Daniel Gisiger, Horst Schütz, Dietrich Thurau, Roman Hermann, Danny Clark, Olaf Ludwig, Remig Stumpf and lastly Carsten Wolf in 1994. 
 Swiss champion in 1 km time trial in 1981, 1983, 1986, and 1987
 Swiss champion of points race in 1981, 1986, 1989, 1990, 1991 and 1992
 Swiss champion of individual pursuit in 1985

Road

1981
 1st Stage 7 Tour de France
 1st Stage 7a Tour de Suisse
 Tour de Romandie
 1st Prologue & Stage 1 
1982
 1st Stage 2 Tour de Suisse
 1st Stage 3 Giro di Sardegna
 Giro d'Italia
 1st Stages 4, 5 & 10
 3rd Nice–Alassio
 5th Grand Prix of Aargau Canton
1983
 1st Stage 3 Giro del Trentino
 Tour de Suisse
 1st Stages 5a & 10 
 2nd Overall Giro di Sardegna
 1st Stage 2 
1984
 Giro d'Italia
 1st  Points classification
 1st Stages 2, 7, 8 & 11
 3rd Trofeo Baracchi
 7th Milano–Torino
 9th Grand Prix des Nations
 9th Critérium des As
1985
 1st Grand Prix of Aargau Canton
 1st Stage 10b Tour de Suisse
 1st Stage 3 Giro del Trentino
 1st Stage 4b Settimana Internazionale di Coppi e Bartali
 Giro d'Italia
 1st Stages 1, 13 & 21
 4th Milano–Torino
 6th Overall Giro di Puglia
 1st Stage 2 
 8th Milan–San Remo
1986
 1st Grand Prix Pino Cerami
 1st Prologue Giro d'Italia
 1st Stage 4 Tirreno–Adriatico
 1st Stage 1 Tour de Suisse
 6th Giro di Campania
1987
 1st Stage 9 Giro d'Italia
 1st Stage 10 Tour de Suisse
 1st Stage 3 Giro di Puglia
1988
 1st Stage 21a Giro d'Italia
 1st Stage 10 Tour de Suisse
 1st Stage 1 Danmark Rundt
 1st Stage 2 Étoile de Bessèges
1989
 1st Stage 10 Tour de Suisse
 1st Stage 2 Tirreno–Adriatico
 Giro d'Italia
 1st Stages 7 & 11
 Tour de Romandie
 1st Stages 3a & 6 
 2nd Grand Prix of Aargau Canton
 2nd GP Lugano
 9th Paris–Roubaix
1990
 1st Stage 3 Setmana Catalana de Ciclisme
 Tour de Romandie
 1st Stages 2a & 6

References

External links

1958 births
Living people
People from the canton of Glarus
Swiss male cyclists
Swiss Tour de France stage winners
Swiss Giro d'Italia stage winners
Tour de Suisse stage winners
UCI Track Cycling World Champions (men)
Olympic cyclists of Switzerland
Cyclists at the 1980 Summer Olympics
Swiss track cyclists